Masquerade is the twelfth studio album by English musical duo Bananarama. It was released on 22 July 2022 as part of the band's 40th anniversary celebrations.

The album was originally conceived as an EP however following the COVID-19 pandemic lockdown beginning, the group began working towards creating a full album. As well as working with longtime collaborator Ian Masterson, Sara Dallin also co-wrote tracks with her daughter Alice Dallin-Walker, known professionally as Alice D.

Favourite was released on 29 April 2022 as a promotional single to launch the album campaign. The track is a cover of Alice D's track of the same name and is one of two covers on the album, the other being "Brand New".

"Masquerade" was released on 15 June 2022 as the lead single. The single was added to the B-List of the BBC Radio 2 playlist and made 'Single of the Week' upon release, before moving onto the A-List the following week.

Bananarama announced that two album launch shows would take place at London Lafayette on 3 and 4 August 2022. The second single released from the album on 12 August is "Forever Young". "Running With the Night" will be released as the album's third single on 14 October.

Track listing

Charts

References

2022 albums
Bananarama albums